Roderick "Roddy" Stephen Gerrard Jones (born 2 December 1944) is a male British former swimmer.

Swimming career
Jones competed in the men's 100 metre backstroke at the 1968 Summer Olympics. At the ASA National British Championships he won the 110 yards backstroke title three times (1966, 1967, 1968) and the 220 yards backstroke title in 1965.

References

External links
 

1944 births
Living people
British male swimmers
Olympic swimmers of Great Britain
Swimmers at the 1968 Summer Olympics
Universiade medalists in swimming
Universiade bronze medalists for Great Britain